The Original Kings of Comedy is the soundtrack to the 2000 film, The Original Kings of Comedy. It was released on August 22, 2000, through Universal Records and mainly consisted of performances by the movie's four stars, Steve Harvey, Bernie Mac, Cedric the Entertainer and D.L. Hughley, but five original music tracks also appeared. The soundtrack peaked at 50 on the Billboard 200 and 15 on the Top R&B/Hip-Hop Albums.

Track listing
"Summer in the City" – 4:36 (St. Lunatics & Nelly)  
"Something's Got to Be Wrong in Cuba" – 1:59 (Steve Harvey) 
"Titanic" – :56 (Steve Harvey)
"Church All the Time" – 7:16 (Steve Harvey) 
"#1 Stunna" – 4:43 (Big Tymers)
"Indecent Proposal" – :33 (D. L. Hughley) 
"Section 8 Island" – :32 (D. L. Hughley)
"Time Out" – :17 (D. L. Hughley) 
"Big Momma" – 1:40 (D. L. Hughley)
"Airplanes" – :27 (D. L. Hughley)
"The Dysfunctional Black Family" – 1:05 (D. L. Hughley)
"I'll Eat Anything" – :52 (D. L. Hughley)
"I Love My Job" – 1:23 (D. L. Hughley)  
"Jesus Was Black" – :38 (D. L. Hughley) 
"Racists" – 1:08 (D. L. Hughley)
"What Blacks Do for Excitment" – 1:12 (D. L. Hughley) 
"Ghetto" – 3:28 (Sticky Fingaz & Petey Pablo)
"Delicious" – 1:00 (Cedric the Entertainer) 
"We Run" – 2:12 (Cedric the Entertainer)
"Ain't You Big Poppa" – 1:38 (Cedric the Entertainer) 
"The Post Tiger Renaissance" – 4:06 (Cedric the Entertainer)  
"Na Na" – 4:28 (Monifah & Chico DeBarge)
"I Say What You Scared to Say" – 1:06 (Bernie Mac)  
"My Sister's Kids" – 8:38 (Bernie Mac) 
"Motherfuckers" – 2:43 (Bernie Mac) 
"What's up Wit That" – 4:20 (Juvenile, Lil Wayne & Big Tymers)

Comedy albums by American artists
Stand-up comedy albums
Spoken word albums by American artists
Live spoken word albums
Comedy film soundtracks
Hip hop soundtracks
2000 soundtrack albums
Universal Records soundtracks
Comedy soundtracks
2000s comedy albums